Donna's Dream House is a charitable trust and holiday home for children with life-threatening or terminal illnesses, situated in the heart of Blackpool, on Chapel Street. The charity was founded in 1999, and is directed, by Len and Barbara Curtis.

Background
Donna Curtis was only 20 when she died having spent four years fighting cancer. Although wracked with pain, she vowed her legacy was to make lives of terminally ill children happier. She set up the Donna Curtis Appeal and worked tirelessly raising funds right until the end. When Donna was first diagnosed, locals around the Foxhall district of Blackpool and Stanley Arms regulars raised £3,500 to send her on a holiday to Disneyland. It made her determined to help make life more bearable for other desperately ill children.

Donna died on New Year's Day in 1996 and she left a red box by her bedside containing three wishes. The first was to raise money for a children's hospice; the second was to raise money to send families from the Fylde to Disneyland and her third, and final, wish was to set up a holiday home for children who were unable to make it to Disneyland.

Once a derelict hotel, which was volunteered by the council for a peppercorn rent, the property is now a haven by which any child would be overwhelmed. The keys were handed over on Donna's birthday, and Len and Barbara's 35th wedding anniversary, which the couple found particularly moving. Most of the facilities of the house have been donated, and many local businesses, hoteliers, nightclub owners, cafe proprietors, shopkeepers and well meaning individuals provide help wherever possible, including raising much-needed cash which helps with the ongoing running costs of the house.

The house consists of four family apartments, all with themed rooms for absolute escapism. Themes include Winnie the Pooh's Den, Cartoon World, Teddy Bear World and a Tangerine Room decked out with Blackpool Football Club merchandise.  All the guests are invited to enjoy the decor of the communal rooms, including a ‘must-see-to-believe’ circus room complete with a steam train encircling the ceiling, and a wonderful Disney room, bursting at the seams with fantastic teddies, soft toys and murals.  Many toys have been supplied by specialist charities or retail outlets - such as Blackpool's Disney shop branch.  Families visiting the house will also receive a pack of tickets for the Tower, the Sealife Centre, Tussards, Blackpool Zoo, the Model Village, Mermaid Cafe and more, again, all kindly donated by the town's businesses.

Fire
Burglars broke into Donna's Dream House in December 2011 and then set fire to log cabins in the rear of the building, causing damage costing £80,000.
A milkman spotted smoke coming from the courtyard of the Donna's Dream House on Chapel Street and alerted the fire service about 07:00 GMT. Founder Len Curtis, who set up the charity in memory of his daughter, Donna, who died at 20, said: "This has ripped the heart out of the charity. I pray the perpetrators never need the help we give to special children." The charity reopened its doors in March 2012.

External links
 Donna's Dream House

References

Charities based in Lancashire